The Graduate School at the University of Arkansas is a center for postgraduate education at that University. It offers over 140 programs through six of the colleges at the University of Arkansas. The University of Arkansas Graduate School is a member of the Conference of Southern Graduate Schools, Council of Graduate Schools, and Arkansas Department of Higher Education.

References

University of Arkansas